is a passenger railway station  located in the city of Kawanishi, Hyōgo Prefecture, Japan. It is operated by the private transportation company Nose Electric Railway.

Lines

Station layout
The station two opposed unnumbered ground-level side platforms. The platforms have an effective length of six cars, but currently only four-car trains stop. Each platform has its own ticket gate, and t is not possible to change platforms within the station. The station is unattended.

Platforms

Adjacent stations

History
Uguisunomori Station opened on August 21, 1953.

Passenger statistics
In fiscal 2019, the station was used by an average of 1056 passengers daily

Surrounding area
The station is located in a suburban residential area.

See also
List of railway stations in Japan

References

External links 

 Uguisunomori  Station official home page 

Railway stations in Hyōgo Prefecture
Stations of Nose Electric Railway
Railway stations in Japan opened in 1953
Kawanishi, Hyōgo